Grauer is a Germanic surname meaning "grey", which may refer to:

 Ben Grauer (1908–1977), U.S. radio and TV personality
 Connie Grauer (born ?), U.S.  musician, co-founding member of Mrs. Fun
 Frederick L. A. Grauer (born ?), U.S. investment banker
 Ona Grauer (born 1978), Mexican-born Canadian actress
 Peter Grauer (born 1946), U.S. businessman and entrepreneur
 Rudolf Grauer (1870–1927), Austrian explorer and zoologist
 Stuart Grauer (born 1950), U.S. educator, author, and founder of the Grauer School
Thaddeus Grauer, Austrian art dealer.
 Uwe Grauer (born 1970), German footballer and coach
 William E. Grauer (born ?), U.S. lawyer

Surnames
Surnames from nicknames